St. Patrick's College, also known as  St. Patrick's Co-Ed Comprehensive College, is a co-educational 11–18 secondary school in Maghera, County Londonderry, Northern Ireland. It teaches within the Roman Catholic ethos. St Patrick’s’ Maghera is known as one of the most successful sporting schools in Ireland, having won five All-Ireland titles.

Catchment and buildings 
St Patrick's is a co-ed comprehensive school, primarily serving those students who live within the Maghera parish, but also those in the wider catchment area from areas such as Randalstown and Dungiven. It consists of two sites, the main site for those in Years 9 to 14 and a separate site for the Year 8's, known as the "St Mary's Building".

Subjects
Pupils enrolled in years 8–10 will take 15 mandatory subjects: English, Maths, Junior Science (a compound subject including Biology, Chemistry and Physics), Religious Studies, Art, Home Economics, Information Technology, Technology (and Design), History, Geography, Irish, and a choice between French or Spanish. Pupils also attend non-exam classes such as Physical Education, Citizenship, and Employability.

In Years 11 and 12, pupils will sit their GCSE examinations, with compulsory classes of: English Language, Maths, a choice between Single, Double or Triple Award science, and Religious Studies. Dependant on what level of science is studied, pupils may select an additional 4, 3 or 2 GCSEs, respectively. These choices are made from the CCEA specification, although a few subjects - such as German - are not offered. These choices are made in Mid-to-Late Year 10. Most pupils in the school will sit English Literature examinations alongside English Language, but only two classes per year (approx 60 pupils) will sit Further Mathematics examinations in their Year 12 alongside standard Mathematics in their Year 11. These Year Groups also sit non-exam classes such as Physical Education, Citizenship and Employability. Some pupils may not be offered English Language, Maths or Double/Triple science, and will opt for Essential Skills English, Essential Skills Maths and Single Award Science, or a mixture of the three.

At A Level, students select 3 A Levels (although some are offered 4, with one taken to only AS level), again from CCEA specifications. Some of these classes require travel to other schools, such as French. Students in Year 13 will sit their AS level examinations, and students in Year 14 will sit their A Level examinations. A Level choices are made in Mid-to-Late Year 12.

All GCSE and A Level classes are subject to enrolment numbers.

Results
According to the ETI assessment of the school in 2015, the academic performance was rated as either "very good" or "outstanding". It noted that "the percentage of pupils progressing to higher education courses is well above the NI average for non-selective schools".

In the academic year 2016/2017, 85.9% of its entrants received five or more GCSEs at grades A* to C, including the core subjects English and Maths.

Awards

- Eco Schools (2021)

Sports
The school has a large tradition in sports—particularly Gaelic sports—and is one of the most successful schools in Northern Ireland in this field. The College have been crowned All-Ireland Champions on 5 occasions, winning the Hogan Cup, most recently in 2013. Additionally , the College currently holds 16 Ulster - MacRory Cup titles as well as 17 Mageean Cups. They are also very successful in junior sports, such as Rannafast titles. Notably, the Senior Camogie team also reached the All-Ireland Senior Camogie Semi-Finals in 2020.

Extracurriculars
St. Patrick's College has two choirs, a Junior Choir for those in those years 8–10, and a Senior Choir for those years 11–14. The choirs tend to jointly perform at school events such as the Christmas Carol Service or the school’s Easter mass, but in recent years the Senior Choir has participated in competitions such as BBC School Choir of the Year (2020).

St Patrick’s also has a debate team, which participates yearly in Concern Debates, an All-Ireland debate tournament organised by charity group Concern. Years 11–14 can participate in the debates, which are organised between other schools. Recently, the team reached the knockout rounds.

St Patrick’s provides opportunities for pupils to use their voice through the roles of Junior and Senior Head Boy and Head Girl, as well as their deputies. Prefects can also be elected to both leadership teams. Junior Leadership runs throughout Year 10, and Senior Leadership through year 14. Opportunities are presented for those in Years 8–14 to be elected to the School Council, with roles such as Chair and Vice-Chair. The Leadership Teams, Prefects and School Council all meet 3 times a year—once a term—to discuss issues they and their peers raise.

The school runs “School Aid Romania”, in which a selection of students from year 13 travel to regions of Romania to provide aid work to the locals, bringing donations of cash and toys for children. This trip is usually headed by Mr Clifford.

Other clubs, such as Eco Club, Chess Club or STEM Club, usually run over lunchtimes or occasionally after school at the discretion of the teachers in charge of the clubs. These clubs are usually run on the goodwill of the teachers.

Subject-specific class trips may occur, such as the Business Studies Department visiting the Tayto Factory or the Music and Performing Arts Department visiting London. 

The school often runs a Ski trip, which usually travels to the Alps.

Year Group trips are usually planned to take place in June for Years 8–10. Years 11–14 do not receive Year Group trips in June.

Controversy
On the 17th of January 2023, one of the art rooms in the 3-storey of the Main Site caught on fire. The fire was discovered to be the result of an old kiln that was left unattended. Two NIFRS engines were dispatched to the incident and the school was temporarily closed on the basis of health and safety concerns. To date, there have been no reports of injuries during the incident.

Notable alumni
 Cathal Ó hOisín (born 1963) – Sinn Féin politician
 Johnny McGurk (born 1965) – Gaelic footballer
 Dermot McNicholl (born 1965) – Gaelic footballer
 Henry Downey (born 1966) – Former Derry Hurler and Gaelic Footballer. Henry played at centre half when Derry won their only All-Ireland Senior Gaelic Football title in 1993, Henry was the captain of this team
 Anthony Tohill (born 1971) – Former Australian Rules Footballer and Gaelic Footballer. Anthony played at midfield when Derry won their only All-Ireland Senior Gaelic Football title in 1993
 Seán Marty Lockhart (born 1976) – Gaelic footballer
 Conor Glass (born 1997) – Former Australian Rules Footballer, Current Gaelic Footballer
 Brooke Scullion (born 1999) - Irish singer, represented Ireland at Eurovision 2022 with her song "That's Rich"

References

Secondary schools in County Londonderry
Catholic secondary schools in Northern Ireland
1963 establishments in Northern Ireland
Educational institutions established in 1963
Maghera, County Londonderry